was a village located in Gunma, Japan during the years 1889–1954.

History
Kanashima Village was formed in 1889 as a result of the merging of five villages: Akutsu Village, Kanai Village, Kawashima Village, Nanboku Village, and Ubashima Village.

On April 1, 1954, Kanashima Village merged with Furumaki Village, Toyoaki Village and Shibukawa Town to become Shibukawa City.

Today
The area formerly held as Kanashima Village is now a part of Shibukawa City, and the name of the former village is retained in the names of an elementary school, a junior high school, and a train station.

Dissolved municipalities of Gunma Prefecture
Shibukawa, Gunma